The Art Gallery of Ballarat is the oldest and largest regional art gallery in Australia.  Established in 1884 as the Ballarat Fine Art Gallery by the citizens of Ballarat, both the building and part of its collection is listed on the Victorian Heritage Register 
and by the National Trust of Victoria.

The gallery was noted as the home of the original Eureka Flag (while the Flag is still part of the Gallery's collection, the Flag is on long term loan to the Eureka Centre Ballarat, at 102 Stawell Street South, Ballarat). The Art Gallery houses major collections covering the history of Australian art from the early colonial period to the present day, which are on display in a thematic hang covering a range of themes including Place, Home, Country and Disruption. 

For the first five years of the gallery's life, the Association rented the large supper room of the Ballarat Academy of Music, now Her Majesty's Theatre, which was made available by Sir William Clarke, 1st Baronet. The Association then worked to secure land on the site of the Government Camp and to raise funds for a permanent home for its collection.  Much of the energy and the money came from a prominent Ballarat citizen, James Oddie. The current building is the oldest purpose built art gallery building in Australia.  
Designed by Tappin, Gilbert and Dennehy in the Renaissance Revival architecture style as a bluestone brick and render facade and stone stairway, the foundation stone was laid by Sir William Clarke in 1887 to commemorate Queen Victoria's Golden Jubilee. The new building was opened by Alfred Deakin on Friday 13 June 1890.

The gallery is a not-for-profit company limited by guarantee, of which the City of Ballarat is the sole shareholder. It is administered by a board of directors. Louise Tegart is the current Director.

The Gallery is supported by the Art Gallery of Ballarat Foundation, which raises funds and receives donations on behalf of the gallery and by the Art Gallery of Ballarat Association, an independent organisation which established the gallery in 1884 and gave it to the Ballaarat City Council in 1972. Membership of the Association is open to members of the public and brings with it a range of benefits, including discounts at the Gallery shop and cafe and invitations to exhibition openings.

Redevelopment and restoration

A 2001 public appeal raised $2 million for expansion of the gallery. The $7 million extension, built by H. Troon and designed by Peddle Thorp, was completed in 2001 to accommodate the expanding collection of contemporary works, temporary exhibits and gallery functions. In addition, two cast-iron verandahs, based on originals first installed on the Lydiard Street facade of the building in 1901 but removed in the 1960s, were reconstructed and reinstated.

Entry to the gallery is free, with entry fees applying only to selected special exhibitions.

A $1.85 million exterior restoration project began in 2009 and was completed in 2010. The renovation resulted in the reversal of unsympathetic 1950s renovations, including removal of paint from the facade and reopening of the windows.

Collection

The collection includes works from Fred Williams, Sidney Nolan, Clarice Beckett, Arthur Boyd, Rupert Bunny, William Dobell, Russell Drysdale, Rick Amor, Heinrich Bűrkel, Louis Buvelot, William Barak, Charles Conder, Dagmar Evelyn Cyrulla, Thomas Flintoff, S T Gill John Glover, Joy Hester, Hans Heysen, Nora Heysen, Norman Lindsay, Howard Arkley, E. Phillips Fox, Robert Jacks, George Johnson, Frederick McCubbin, Tom Roberts, Arthur Streeton, William Barak, George Bell, William Henry Bartlett (1858–1932), Charles Blackman, Merric Boyd, Michael Kmit, Arthur Boyd, John Brack, Charles Conder, Nicholas Chevalier, David Davies (artist), Janet Dawson, Robert Hawker Dowling and Eugene von Guerard.

Gallery of selected works
Note that other notable works are in the collection but the following examples are ones in the public domain and for which pictures are available.

Notes

External links
Art Gallery of Ballarat website
Culture Victoria

Art museums and galleries in Victoria (Australia)
Buildings and structures in Ballarat
Victorian Heritage Register Grampians (region)
1884 establishments in Australia
Art museums established in 1884
Tourist attractions in Ballarat